The Janashakti is the organ of the Communist Party of India Bihar State Council. The first editor was Sunil Mukherjee and it started in 1947.

References

Publications established in 1947
Communist periodicals published in India
Communist Party of India
Communist newspapers